Floritettix aptera, the wingless Florida grasshopper, is a species of spur-throated grasshopper in the family Acrididae. It is found in Florida, as the name suggests.

References

External links

 

Melanoplinae
Insects described in 1878